The Mummy: Tomb of the Dragon Emperor is a third-person action adventure video game adaption of film of the same name. The PlayStation 2 and Wii versions of the game were developed by Eurocom, while the Nintendo DS version was developed by Artificial Mind and Movement (or A2M). The game was published by Sierra Entertainment, a subsidiary of Vivendi Games. It was released worldwide in Q3 2008.

Gameplay 
The Mummy: Tomb of the Dragon Emperor follows the same plot as the film. The player controls either Rick O'Connell or his son, Alex, from a third-person perspective. The game combines platforming, puzzle-solving, and combat elements into its gameplay, and consists of six levels.

The game's platforming sections, have been compared to those of the Tomb Raider series, and allow the player to perform several acrobatic manoeuvres, such as jumping or shimmying along edges. The player must also evade dangers and traps such as rotating saws or falling debris.

During combat, the game allows the player to switch between gun combat and hand-to-hand combat. The player has a range of melee attacks that can be used against enemies, and can also evade the attacks of enemies. Gun combat features a lock-on system, and the player can use either pistols, shotguns or tommy guns. The game also includes puzzle-solving, in the form of hieroglyphic decoding. Additional unlockables, such as concept art, can be obtained by collecting artifacts hidden throughout the levels.

Reception

The game received mostly negative reviews upon its release. On aggregator website Metacritic, The Mummy: Tomb of the Dragon Emperor currently holds a 43/100, 38/100, and a 39/100 rating for the DS, PS2 and Wii versions respectively. On GameRankings, the game has scores of 46.29% (DS), 41.67% (PS2) and 41.71% (Wii).

Jack DeVries of IGN gave the Nintendo DS version a 4.5/10. DeVries criticised most aspects of the game, specifically "terrible" voiceover work and restrictive gameplay, saying "the game is rigid in its progression to the point of doing absolutely stupid things", but acknowledging that the game had "some decent cinematics". The GameSpot review for the Wii and PS2 versions gave the game 3.5/10, calling the boss battle "unspeakably horrible", but praising "nicely detailed, varied environments". 1UP.com gave the same versions a C− rating. The reviewer listed "bland melee combat", "zero control of the camera", and "the inability to save during missions" as some of its flaws, but also mentioned that the puzzle-solving "complements the action nicely".

References

External links 

2008 video games
Action-adventure games
Nintendo DS games
PlayStation 2 games
The Mummy video games
Video games based on Chinese mythology
Video games based on films
Video games developed in Canada
Video games developed in the United Kingdom
Video games set in China
Wii games
Behaviour Interactive games
Eurocom games
Multiplayer and single-player video games
Sierra Entertainment games